Grand-Daddy Day Care is a 2019 American comedy film distributed by Universal 1440 and Revolution Studios. It is the third and final installment in the Daddy Day Care film series.

Plot
Frank Collins is a best-selling author, who suffers from writer's block. While attempting to write his next novel he and his wife, Emma, struggle to pay their bills and make ends meet. Her hard-headed former convict/retired lawyer father, Eduardo, comes to live with them. Finding it more difficult to entertain his father-in-law and attempt to write his next novel, Frank decides to invite Eduardo's friends into the house to keep him preoccupied. Their home, now filled with senior citizens, falls into disarray. The Collins couple realize that they could make more money by housing and monitoring these elderly individuals. Upon learning of the business being run in the house, a persistent social worker named Ned Tooley becomes determined to shut them down.

Eduardo uses his law expertise to plan a course of action that would allow Frank and Emma to stay in business. Together they purchase the established, but on hiatus, Daddy Day Care from Charles "Charlie" Hinton. Charles recounts his attempts at success with the business, warning them about the unfortunate life-events that may follow. After purchasing the company, they attempt to register and rebrand the establishment as "Granddaddy Day Care". Upon doing so, they learn that there is a waiting period. After being fined by the city, due to the social worker's analysis, the Collins couple struggle to earn enough money to pay their debtors and the fines. Eduardo, who has shown the early stages of dementia, decides to help them sue the city. In court they present their case that they were not issued any warnings. The judge rules in favor of Grand-Daddy Day Care, and the company continues to grow and flourish. Frank, Emma, their son Jordan, and Eduardo begin to grow closer as a family and realize how great their lives have become. Frank meanwhile, gets a new idea for a fiction book based on his experiences running Grand-Daddy Day Care. It becomes a best-seller.

Cast

References

External links
 
 

2019 films
2019 comedy films
2019 direct-to-video films
American comedy films
American sequel films
Direct-to-video comedy films
Direct-to-video sequel films
Films produced by Mike Elliott
Films shot in California
Revolution Studios films
Universal Pictures direct-to-video films
Films directed by Ron Oliver
2010s English-language films
2010s American films